Chaldoran-e Shomali Rural District is in the Central District of Chaldoran County, West Azerbaijan province, Iran. At the National Census of 2006, its population was 7,286 in 1,503 households. There were 7,773 inhabitants in 1,952 households at the following census of 2011. At the most recent census of 2016, the population of the rural district was 7,075 in 1,951 households. The largest of its 56 villages was Sadal, with 1,092 people.

References 

Chaldoran County

Rural Districts of West Azerbaijan Province

Populated places in West Azerbaijan Province

Populated places in Chaldoran County